Bikram Singha is an Indian Bengali-language action film directed by Rajib Biswas. A remake of the 2006 Telugu-language film Vikramarkudu, it stars Prosenjit Chatterjee in a double role along with Richa Gangopadhyay & Anusmriti Sarkar. Bollywood actress Mahek Chahal did an item song in this film, marking Bengali debut

The film received an "A" certificate from the Central Board of Film Certification. The film was dubbed into Hindi as "Ek Rowdy Bikram".

Plot
Gupi (Prosenjit Chatterjee) is a small-time conman in love with Madhu (Richa Gangopadhyay), a pretty woman whom he met at a wedding he wasn't invited to. Into this picture, the world enters six-year-old Osmita (Baby Titli), who inexplicably believes Gupi to be her dad. And if this wasn't bad enough, Gupi becomes the object of a series of life-threatening attacks by a gang of criminals who seem to know something he doesn't.

While trying desperately to save his life and love, Gupi stumbles upon a deadly secret. A secret that will take him to a small town named Debgarh: A town terrorized by its ruthless MLA and the mafia he controls; a town whose inhabitants' only hope for redemption is Gupi.

Later, he learns that ACP Bikram Singha Roy (Prosenjit Chatterjee), his look alike, is in danger from criminals.

Cast
 Prosenjit Chatterjee as ACP Bikram Singha Roy (Super Cop)/Gupi, The Thief
 Richa Gangopadhyay as Madhu
 Anusmriti Sarkar as Ritwika Mitro
 Partho Sarathi Chakraborty as Bagha
 Ashmee Ghosh as Baby Titli
 Supriyo Datta as Kali
 Besant Ravi as Rahu
 Surajit Sen as Munna
 Prodyot Mukherjee as Madhu's Father
 Sabyasachi Chakrabarty as Senior Inspector (Special Appearance)
 Mahek Chahal (special appearance in item song "Na Champa Na Chameli")
 Sanghasri Sinha Mitra as Srimoti

Soundtrack

References

External links
 

Indian action films
2012 films
Bengali remakes of Telugu films
2012 action films
Films about lookalikes
Fictional portrayals of the West Bengal Police
Films shot in Kolkata
2012 masala films
Indian police films
Bengali-language Indian films
2010s Bengali-language films
Films directed by Rajiv Kumar Biswas